The following is a list of books by John C. Maxwell.  His books have sold more than twenty million copies, with some on the New York Times Best Seller List. Some of his works have been translated into fifty languages.  By 2012, he has sold more than 20 million books.

In his book, Sometimes You Win, Sometimes You Learn, Maxwell claims that he has published seventy-one different books.

List of books by John C. Maxwell
 2021"Success is a choice" 
2021"Change your world"

Books in other languages 
 List of John C. Maxwell's Books translated in Romanian

References 

Bibliographies by writer
Bibliographies of American writers